Cat Peak is a  mountain summit located within Olympic National Park in Clallam County of Washington state.

Description

Set within the Daniel J. Evans Wilderness, Cat Peak is the westernmost peak of the Bailey Range, which is a subrange of the Olympic Mountains. With clear weather, the mountain can be seen by hikers from High Divide or Hurricane Hill. The nearest higher neighbor is Mount Carrie  to the east-southeast, and Mount Olympus rises  to the south. Precipitation runoff from the mountain drains north into Cat Creek which is a tributary of the Elwha River, and south into the Hoh River. Topographic relief is significant as the summit rises over 4,400 feet (1,340 m) above the Hoh River in approximately one mile.

History

The mountain's name has been officially adopted by the U.S. Board on Geographic Names. The peak is named in association with Cat Creek, which heads on the peak. The creek was christened "Wildcat Creek" by the 1889–90 Seattle Press Expedition because an expedition member killed a bobcat on February 28, 1890, where the creek joins the Elwha River.

Climate
Based on the Köppen climate classification, Cat Peak is located in the marine west coast climate zone of western North America. Most weather fronts originate in the Pacific Ocean, and travel east toward the Olympic Mountains. As fronts approach, they are forced upward by the peaks of the Olympic Range, causing them to drop their moisture in the form of rain or snowfall (Orographic lift). As a result, the Olympics experience high precipitation, especially during the winter months. During winter months, weather is usually cloudy, but, due to high pressure systems over the Pacific Ocean that intensify during summer months, there is often little or no cloud cover during the summer. The months June through October offer the most favorable weather for viewing and climbing.

Geology

The Olympic Mountains are composed of obducted clastic wedge material and oceanic crust, primarily Eocene sandstone, turbidite, and basaltic oceanic crust. The mountains were sculpted during the Pleistocene era by erosion and glaciers advancing and retreating multiple times.

Gallery

See also

 Olympic Mountains
 Geology of the Pacific Northwest

References

External links
 
 Weather forecast: Cat Peak

Olympic Mountains
Mountains of Washington (state)
Landforms of Olympic National Park
North American 1000 m summits
Mountains of Clallam County, Washington